Paul Stanley Boardman (born 6 November 1967) is an English former professional footballer and sports broadcaster who worked for Sky Sports News.

Football career
After graduating with a Bachelor of Science in Kinesiology from the University of Maryland, Boardman signed a professional contract with Plymouth Argyle, scoring on his league debut against Bournemouth. His career came to an end after two and a half years following an injury, having made only three league appearances.

Later career
After eight years spent doing stand-up on the comedy circuit, Boardman moved into television, presenting a show on satellite TV channel Men and Motors called Boobs. He joined Sky Sports News as a presenter in June 2001, and also hosted the football phone-in show You're On Sky Sports. He later hosted Sky Sports' football-highlight show Football First.

Personal life
Boardman is the son of comedian Stan Boardman and twin brother of television presenter Andrea Boardman. He supports Everton FC

References 

https://www.tvnewsroom.co.uk/biography-images/paul-boardman-1310/

English television presenters
Plymouth Argyle F.C. players
1973 births
Living people
English footballers
Association football forwards
English Football League players
Television presenters from Liverpool
Footballers from Liverpool